Mycobacterium haemophilum is a species of the phylum Actinomycetota (Gram-positive bacteria with high guanine and cytosine content, one of the dominant phyla of all bacteria), belonging to the genus Mycobacterium.

Description
Short, occasionally curved, gram-positive, nonmotile and strongly acid-fast rods.

Colony characteristics
Nonpigmented and rough to smooth colonies.

Physiology
Media have to be supplemented with 0.4% haemoglobin or 60 μM hemin (factor X) or 15 mg/ml ferric ammonium citrate respectively, but not with FeCl3 or catalase.
Slow growth on Löwenstein–Jensen medium or Middlebrook 7H10 agar at 32 °C within 2 to 4 weeks.
Growth slower at 25 °C and 35 °C and absent at 37 °C.
Strictly intracellular growth in tissue cultures of fibroblasts.

Differential characteristics
Unique among mycobacteria in its requirement for hemin or ferric ammonium citrate for growth.

Distribution.

Pathogenesis
Infects patients with suppressed immune systems.
Clinical presentation: multiple skin nodules occurring in clusters or without definitive pattern, commonly involving the extremities. Abscesses, draining fistulas and osteomyelitis may be associated with the nodules. Paediatric patients with localised cervical lymphadenopathy.
Biosafety level 2

Type strain
First isolated in Israel from a subcutaneous granuloma from a patient with Hodgkin's disease. An environmental reservoir is presumed.
Strain ATCC 29548 = CCUG 47452 = CIP 105049 = DSM 44634 = NCTC 11185.

Notes

References

External links
Type strain of Mycobacterium haemophilum at BacDive -  the Bacterial Diversity Metadatabase

Acid-fast bacilli
haemophilum
Bacteria described in 1978